Ernest James Liffiton (January 25, 1885 – January 23, 1949) an early professional ice hockey player. Over the span of his career he played for Pittsburgh Bankers, Pittsburgh Professionals, Renfrew Creamery Kings, Montreal Wanderers, Halifax Crescents and the Toronto Tecumsehs. In 1908 he played on the Montreal Wanderers team that won the Stanley Cup.

Renfew vs. Pembroke
In December 1907 the Pembroke Hockey Club refused to play against the Renfrew Creamery Kings. They objected to the presence of Ernie, who was a member of Montreal Wanderers at the time, and was slated to play for the team. In that match and one that followed, both teams brought in professional players from Montreal and Ottawa to bolster their chances for victory.

Personal life
Ernie was the son of a jeweler and grew up in a family of one sister and five brothers. In 1909, at the age of twenty-four, Ernie married Louise Jane Thomas. He worked in his fathers Montreal wholesale jewelry and confection store, but in later years moved to Windsor, Ontario where he worked in the steel industry. He and his second wife, Hedwig "Hattie" Rueckwald, would go on to raise four children.

Although Ernie played hockey professionally, the census records of 1911 identify his job as "clerk".

His older brother Charlie Liffiton was also a professional hockey player.

External links
"Ernie Liffiton First Tier Player from Montreal" liffiton.net
"Is Pittsburgh the Birthplace of Professional Hockey?" pittsburghhockey.net
NHA career stats from the Hockey Nexus thehockeynexus.com

1885 births
1949 deaths
Canadian ice hockey left wingers
Montreal Wanderers players
Pittsburgh Bankers players
Pittsburgh Professionals players
Renfrew Hockey Club players
Ice hockey people from Montreal
Stanley Cup champions
Toronto Tecumsehs players